{{DISPLAYTITLE:C10H16N2O3}}
The molecular formula C10H16N2O3 (molar mass: 212.24 g/mol, exact mass: 212.1161 u) may refer to:

 Butabarbital
 Butobarbital, also called butobarbitone or butethal
 Propylbarbital